Asymades is a genus of beetles in the family Buprestidae, containing the following species:

 Asymades boranus (Obenberger, 1940)
 Asymades transvalensis Kerremans, 1893

References

Buprestidae genera